The William G. Milne House at 508 E. 9th St. in Dell Rapids, South Dakota was built in 1902.  It was designed by W. L. Dow & Son in Queen Anne style.  It has also been known as Norgaard House and as Peterson House.  It was listed on the National Register of Historic Places in 1994.

The house is a two-and-a-half-story wood-frame house with a rounded porch.

References

Houses on the National Register of Historic Places in South Dakota
Queen Anne architecture in South Dakota
Houses completed in 1902
Houses in Minnehaha County, South Dakota
National Register of Historic Places in Minnehaha County, South Dakota